TsuShiMaMiRe (つしまみれ, TSMMR) is an all-girl Japanese rock trio. Their style is eclectic punk rock, mixing noisy and pop instrumental sounds with idiosyncratic, quirky, often funny or disturbing lyrics. They are one of the many bands to have become famous in the United States through the Austin, Texas South by Southwest music festival, and also through their performances at anime conventions, with the Suicide Girls, and at Benten Label's "Japan Girls Nite" U.S. tours.

The band's original lineup consisted of Mari Kono on lead guitar and vocals, Yayoi Tsushima on bass, and Mizue Masuda on drums. They originally formed the band while in college in Chiba, Japan. In January 2017, Mizue announced she was leaving the band to pursue other projects. The band now performs with their new drummer, Maiko Takagi.

Origin of the name
Tsushimamire is a neologism coined by the band, not a real Japanese word. It is a combination of Tsushima (the family name of bassist Yayoi) with "Ma" (from guitarist/vocalist Mari Kono) and "Mi" (from original drummer Mizue Masuda). In addition, mamire means "mixed up" in Japanese: thus the effect is that of "Tsushima (Yayoi), Mari and Mizue all mixed together."

Musical style and themes
TsuShiMaMiRe's musical style can be broadly classified as punk rock, with eclectic influences of noise and Japanese pop music.  Several of their songs begin with strong bass lines by Yayoi, but Mari's guitar and Mizue's drums finally make equal contributions.  Several songs combine sweet female vocal harmonies with hard drum playing and punk guitar riffs, for a deliberately ironic effect, for example in their signature tune, "Tea Time Ska".  The lyrics are consistently quirky and idiosyncratic, with the most common themes being sex, food, and death, and sometimes all three at once.  Underneath sweet vocal harmonies, the lyrics frequently hint at far darker, scarier themes.

Food is a noticeable subject in their lyrics. In the rap-rock title song from "no-miso shortcake (brain shortcake)", lead singer Mari invites the listener to eat her brain. In "Kamaboco (Fish Cakes)", all three girls play the roles of food ingredients in Japanese hotpot, with fish cakes (Mari) feeling rejected and lonely because she is never added to hotpot.  In their very first single, "American Hamburger", an upbeat pop song, the singer describes herself as fat and food-loving but beautiful; the first line is, "I'm a pig so I eat pork."

Some of their most powerful songs address death and its inevitability.  In "Na-mellow (Nameru)", the singer plays the role of the young daughter of a fisherman, who gradually realizes her father will never return from a fishing voyage. In "Manhole", the singer speculates about where manholes in the street might lead to, perhaps to the land of the dead.

Another common theme is sex, which is frequently juxtaposed against the squeaky-clean stereotype of the innocent-looking Japanese girl. In the title song from Pregnant Fantasy, the unborn baby of a pregnant teenager asks why her mother will bear her when she is not wanted.  In "World Peace & BOU", the singer appears to be speculating that world peace can be brought about by a cartoon penis.

"Tea Time Ska", the song which often closes their live shows, features a unique mix of punk-rock screaming and sweet harmonies.  It describes an innocent young girl who invites her first boyfriend home for tea.  However, her father, "who loves me too much", becomes jealous of the boyfriend because his daughter has never made tea for him. Despite what might appear to be a dark tone to Western audiences, Mari confirms there is nothing dark about the song.

Influences

In interviews, the band members have stated that their original inspiration was to be a female version of the Japanese band Blankey Jet City, whose rock music is very fast, energetic, and full of rapid changes. They also consider Rage Against the Machine to be an influence. Yayoi has also expressed a fondness for Western classical music.

History

Mari (vocals and lead guitar), Mizue (chorus and drums) and Yayoi Tsushima (chorus and bass guitar) formed TsuShiMaMiRe in 1999 while they were all still college students. They started playing in various clubs in the Chiba prefecture, as well as releasing their first demo single "Hamburger Set" in 1999 and then their second demo single "Bloody Mohawk" [Ryuketsu Mohikan] in 2001.

In 2004, they toured with other Japanese bands Petty Booka, Bleach, Noodles, and Kokeshi Doll in the United States as well as performing at the South by Southwest Japan Nite showcase. On August 25 of the same year they released their first full-length album Pregnant Fantasy on Benten Label.

In March 2005, they toured the United States once again in the “Japan Girls Nite US Tour.” Along with some of their previous tour mates, this excursion included notable rock group The Pillows. Though the short tour only went through a few cities such as Chicago, New York, Seattle, Boston, Los Angeles, and San Francisco, the tour was met warmly and gave them extra exposure. This prompted Benten Label to release the girls' first album and future records in the United States through the Australian Cattle God label.

Also in 2005, they performed as an opening act for the "Suicide Girls Live Burlesque Tour" which involved a grueling thirty-five shows in about one month's time, September 30 through November 5. After the Suicide Girls tour, they also played a few small west coast dates with other Japanese girl bands, once again part of the Benten Label's “Girls Nite Tour.”

In 2006 they were invited as musical guests to perform at Anime Central, making it their first American convention appearance.  Afterward they toured a second time with Suicide Girls.  This tour was cut short when the Suicide Girls changed plans to become the opening act for Guns N' Roses.  As the last several shows were suddenly cancelled, TsuShiMaMiRe played a few hastily arranged shows on the west coast.

On July 7, 2007, TsuShiMaMiRe released their album no-miso shortcake [脳みそショートケーキ] (called brain shortcake in English-speaking countries). This was released through the July Records label, unlike their earlier CDs which were released through Benten, apparently indicating a change of label.  This is an enhanced CD, containing seven songs and a Flash animated music video for "Air Control Remote Control." The CD was initially listed as available on Amazon.com in the US, but later its status was changed to unavailable.  As of September 2007, the CD was currently available as an import from Amazon in Japan and from www.hmv.co.jp.

On September 15, 2007, they were featured on the Firefox Rock Festival which was streamed from Tokyo live over the internet.

In 2010 TsuShiMaMiRe released the album Sex on the Beach and were featured on the compilation I Love J Rock on Good Charamel Records in North America. In November 2010 they toured the US with Japanese punk band Peelander-Z.

In 2015, the band released the LP Abandon Human. The following year they toured in support of the album, visiting the United States twice (west coast and east coast), and at the end of the year they also had their first ever European tour, playing shows in and around Germany. They attempted to play at a festival in Russia, but could not enter the country due to visa problems.

In January 2017, drummer Mizue Masuda announced that, after 17½ years, she was leaving TsuShiMaMiRe to pursue other projects. The three original members had been together since their college days. Their last show together took place in Chiba, Japan, where they got their start and it was later released on DVD. 

In 2017 following Mizue's departure, drummer Maiko Takagi (ex. BUMBUMS/ Spinoza) joined the band as a support drummer for TsuShiMaMiRe World Tour 2017 in Europe. Shortly after joining, Maiko was announced the new official drummer for Tsushimamire. In October 2017, the band released their latest album, NEW.

The band was also backed briefly in 2017 by support drummer Shigeru Toyota (formerly of Usotsuki Barbie), with whom they recorded and released the album Tsushimageru.

Awards
In 2007 they were voted "Best All-Girl Group" in Shojo Beat magazine's Reader's Poll, with 73.4% of the vote.

Discography

Soundtracks
Paper Beast (Videogame) w/Roly Porter (2020)

Live DVDs
良いDVDです。 (Yoi DVD Desu.) (2005)
Live DVD (2006)
バンドは水物 (Band wa Mizumono) 10th Anniversary (2009)
Blood Movie (2012)
NO PUNK (2013)
15周年記念LIVE DVD「バンドは水物２」(15th Anniversary) (2014)
HANAMAMIRE 2016 [LIVE at daikanyama UNIT]  (2016)
Mari, Yayoi & Mizue's Live DVD [LIVE at Chiba LOOK] (2017)

Music videos
エアコンのリモコン (Air Control & Remote Control) (animated, 2007)
Sakuranboy (2008)
Mi Kara Deta Sabi (2008)
Hyper Sweet Power  (2009)
タイムラグ (Time Lag) (2009)
まつり (Matsuri) (2009)
ストロボ (Strobe) (2010)
献血ソング (Blood Song) (2011)
グレープフルーツガール (Grapefruit girl) (2011)
Hungry and Empty (2012)
JAGUAR (2013)
Bad Dream Bear (2013)
Speedy Wonder (2014)
Ningen Coating (2015)
Hang Out! (2015)
Under the Sky of Yesterday (animated, 2015)
Tokyo Jellyfish (2017)
Tsushimageru (2017)
Anarchy Morning (2018)
The Payday (2019)
LUCKY (2021)
SHOT YOU (2021)

References

External links
English language Tsu Shi Ma Mi Re site from Benten Label Tokyo
Tsu Shi Ma Mi Re official website (Japanese)
MySpace page (English)
Morning Scene interview
Keikaku.net interview 1 interview 2
Discussing how they made their first album
TsuShiMaMiRe Fan Page (lyrics and interview)

All-female punk bands
Japanese alternative rock groups
Japanese punk rock groups
Musical groups from Chiba Prefecture